Mohamed Mchengerwa (born September 1, 1979) is the current Minister of Natural resources and Tourism in Tanzania. He is a member of the Chama Cha Mapinduzi political party. He was elected MP representing Rufiji in 2015.

Political Career 
Mchengerwa got his first major cabinet position following the formation of Samia Suluhu Hassan first cabinet on March 31, 2021. He was sworn in as the Minister of State in the Presidents office for Public Service Management and Good Governance. Following the cabinet reshuffle in January 2022, Mchengerwa switched dockets with Innocent Bashungwa and assumed the position of Minister of Culture, Artists and Sports.

In February 2023, he switched dockets with Pindi Chana and became the new Minister of Natural resources and Tourism.

References 

1979 births
Living people
Chama Cha Mapinduzi politicians
Tanzanian MPs 2015–2020
Tanzanian MPs 2020–2025